Edgar Haniel von Haimhausen (12 December 1870 in Ruhrort (now Duisburg) –14 January 1935 in Munich) was a German diplomat.

Life
After studying Jurisprudence at the University of Bonn and his promotion Haniel joined the diplomatic service. From 1900 on in different countries, last position was in Washington, Haniel returned to the Foreign Office in Berlin. 1918 he belonged to the artistic commission and became in 1919 general secretary of the German delegation which made the Treaty of Versailles. After this he became low Secretary of State, in 1922 Secretary of State in the ministry of foreign affairs.

Haniel, belonged to the industrial Haniel family was the owner of Schlosses Haimhausen near München. In 1905, he was raised to hereditary Prussian nobility. First he was married to Margarete von Brauchitsch, in second marriage with Hedwig von Branca née Frankenburger, the mother of architect Alexander Freiherr von Branca.

Since 1891 he was a member of Corps Palatia Bonn.

References

People from Duisburg
1870 births
1935 deaths
German diplomats